Omorgus maindroni is a species of hide beetle in the subfamily Omorginae and subgenus Afromorgus.

References

maindroni
Beetles described in 2005